Betty Young is a college administrator in the United States who is the president of Hocking College. Young has served as president of two other community colleges, Northwest State Community College and Asheville-Buncombe Technical Community College.

Education
Young graduated from Ohio University in Athens with an associate degree in math and science, a bachelor's degree in business administration, a master's degree in education, and a doctorate in higher education. A graduate of Capital University Law School in Columbus, Young is licensed to practice law in Ohio and West Virginia.

Career

Washington State Community College
Young began her career in higher education as a faculty member and department chair at Washington State Community College.

Franklin University
Young served as an academic administrator at Franklin University beginning in 1999.

Northwest State Community College
Young was president of Northwest State Community College in Archbold, Ohio from 2003 until 2007.

In September 2005, Young responded to a joke by late-night talk show host Jay Leno calling a sex industry education seminar "less embarrassing than going to a junior college" by staging a publicity tour called "The Lessons for Leno National Tour." Young made a trip from Ohio to California almost entirely on her Harley-Davidson motorcycle, had a brief meeting with Leno, then staged a press conference defending two-year universities.

Asheville-Buncombe Technical Community College
Young was named president of Asheville-Buncombe Technical Community College in Asheville, North Carolina, on September 1, 2007. She resigned in Spring 2009.

Houston Community College
Young was appointed president of Coleman College for Health Sciences, a part of the Houston Community College, starting April 1, 2009. Chancellor Cesar Maldonado fired Young in 2014.

Hocking College
Young was named interim president of Hocking College in October 2014 and was given the permanent position in April 2015.

In February 2016, Young received a vote of no confidence from 92.93% of the college's faculty and staff. Criticisms laid out in a letter to the chairman of the Board of Trustees included overcrowded classes, an overuse of adjunct professors, inexperienced instructors, a lack of transparency in her leadership, and a disregard for staff and faculty input leading to a "continuous decline in morale among staff, faculty, students, alumni and the community."

References

Presidents of Northwest State Community College
Living people
Ohio University alumni
Capital University Law School alumni
Franklin University faculty
Year of birth missing (living people)